Conway High School may refer to:

 Conway High School (Arkansas) - Conway, Arkansas
 Conway High School (Missouri) - Conway, Missouri
 Conway High School (South Carolina) - Conway, South Carolina
 Conway Springs High School - Conway Springs, Kansas